The Liga Futsal 2011 was the premier futsal league in Brazil, was the 16th edition and organized by the Brazilian Futsal Confederation (CBFS).

Teams

The Championship

First phase

Second phase

Group A

Group B

Grupo C

Grupo D

Knockout phase

References

External links
  Liga Fusal's official website
  Futsal Brasil Portal

Liga Nacional de Futsal
2011 in futsal
Liga